Ernest O'Brien (26 August 1900 – 2 November 1935) was an Australian cricketer. He played three first-class matches for New South Wales between 1926/27 and 1927/28.

See also
 List of New South Wales representative cricketers

References

External links
 

1900 births
1935 deaths
Australian cricketers
New South Wales cricketers
Cricketers from Sydney